Snapper is a clone of the Namco arcade game Pac-Man  programmed by Jonathan Griffiths for the BBC Micro and released as one of the launch titles for Acornsoft in 1982. It was also one of Acornsoft's launch titles for the Acorn Electron in 1983.

Snapper started the BBC Micro tradition of controlling arcade games using the Z, X, : and / keys for horizontal and vertical motion, since  on most BBC models the arrow keys were not conveniently placed for gaming.

Gameplay
As in Pac-Man, bonus items such as fruit sometimes appear in the centre of the screen. The highest-scoring bonus item is an acorn, a reference to the publishers. When Snapper is killed, t shrinks and turns into small lines pointing in all directions.

The main difference in gameplay between Pac-Man and Snapper is the behaviour of the ghosts (or monsters). In Pac-Man, each ghost has its own personality and follows set patterns for each level. The red ghost also travels at double speed after a certain number of dots are eaten. In Snapper, the monsters begin each level by patrolling their corners a set number of times before breaking from their route to chase the Snapper. The time before breaking the route is reduced for each level until on later levels, the monsters chase Snapper almost immediately. The only real difference between the monsters is the corner they patrol and how soon they break from their route (e.g. the red ghost is always the first). Also, in Pac-Man, the main character slows when eating dots (so ghosts can catch up to him) but this does not happen in Snapper. These changes lead to a game which is much easier in the early levels but gets progressively more difficult so games tend to last longer.

Development

In development, the game was titled Puc Man (the first Japanese title of the arcade game was Puck Man) but the name was changed before release to avoid legal action. However, the initial release of the game was so close to Pac-Man (including the design of the game's characters) that this version had to be withdrawn and re-released with the characters changed. The player's character became a round yellow face with very short legs wearing a green cowboy hat and the ghosts became skinny humanoid monsters.

References

External links
 Video clip of BBC Micro version (running at double speed)

1982 video games
BBC Micro and Acorn Electron games
BBC Micro and Acorn Electron-only games
Acornsoft games
Video games developed in the United Kingdom
Single-player video games